Sander Arends and David Pel were the defending champions but only Pel chose to defend his title, partnering Jonathan Eysseric.

Seeds

Draw

References

External links
 Main draw

Open Saint-Brieuc - Doubles
2023 Doubles